Chen Siyi  is an elite Chinese gymnast. She trains at the National Training Center in Beijing. She's coached by Xiong Jingbin and Zhang Xia, who also coached Deng Linlin and Jiang Yuyuan. Her best events are uneven bars and balance beam.

Junior career 
Chen competed in the Junior Nationals in 2010, where she placed tenth on vault.

At the Individual Nationals, she had a sixth-place finish on bars. At the Élite Gym Massilia in the fall, where she made her international debut, she won gold on bars, silver in AA and placed fourth on beam, despite a fall.

In January, she competed at the Australian Olympic Youth Festival with three other Chinese juniors. She won gold with the team and silver on balance beam. In September, she competed at the Chinese National Games, placing sixth with her team and eighteenth in the all-around.

Senior career

2014
Chen was named to the team selected to compete at both the Asian Games in Incheon and World Championships in Nanning. Alongside teammates Yao Jinnan, Shang Chunsong, Huang Huidan, Tan Jiaxin, and Bai Yawen, the Chinese team won gold in Incheon ahead of the North Korean and South Korean teams and silver in Nanning behind the United States and ahead of Russia. In Incheon, Chen placed third in the individual all-around qualifications, placing only 0.100 points behind teammate Shang. However, due to the two-per-country rule, only Yao and Shang were able to compete in the finals. In Nanning, she was less successful due to having a cold throughout much of the competition.

Competitive history

External links 

1998 births
Chinese female artistic gymnasts
Living people
Sportspeople from Fuzhou
Gymnasts at the 2014 Asian Games
Asian Games medalists in gymnastics
Medalists at the World Artistic Gymnastics Championships
Asian Games gold medalists for China
Medalists at the 2014 Asian Games
Gymnasts from Fujian
21st-century Chinese women
People from Lianjiang County